A bondage hood (also called a gimp mask or bondage mask) is a fetishistic hood. It may be made from rubber, latex, PVC, spandex, darlexx or leather.  Full-faced hoods are typically used for the practice of head bondage, and to restrain and objectify the wearer through depersonalization, disorientation and/or sensory deprivation.

The use of bondage hoods can be hazardous if breathing is impeded.

Bondage hoods are frequently referenced in popular culture, most notably in the film Pulp Fiction.

See also 

 Total enclosure fetishism
 Gimp suit
 Hooding

References

External links 
 

BDSM equipment
Fetish clothing